James Fletcher Whitin (December 21, 1814 - March 2, 1902) was the youngest son of Paul C. Whitin, and brother of John Crane Whitin, who founded the Whitin Machine Works in 1831 at Northbridge, Massachusetts. 
James Whitin would also enter the family textile business, at a later age. The Whitin Machine Works grew to become one of the largest textile machinery companies in the world.

The village of South Northbridge became known as Whitinsville 1835, in honor of his father.

In 1864 when his mother Betsy decided to divide the family business among four of her sons, James acquired the Crown and Eagle Mill in North Uxbridge, Massachusetts, and land near the Whitin Railroad Depot where he built the Linwood Mill in 1866.

References

1814 births
1902 deaths
Businesspeople from Massachusetts
19th-century American businesspeople